Hovtashat is a village in the Masis Municipality of the Ararat Province of Armenia.

References 

World Gazeteer: Armenia – World-Gazetteer.com

Populated places in Ararat Province
Yazidi populated places in Armenia